Liz Feldman (born May 21, 1977) is an American comedian, actress, producer and writer. She is best known as the creator and executive producer of the Netflix dark comedy series Dead to Me. She also created One Big Happy and has written for 2 Broke Girls, The Ellen DeGeneres Show, and Blue Collar TV.

Early life
Feldman was born and raised in Brooklyn, New York.

Career
Feldman began her career as a stand-up comic at the age of 16 and made her TV debut as a performer and writer for All That on Nickelodeon in 1995. She is a graduate of Boston University and an alumna of The Second City and The Groundlings. She went on to write for Blue Collar TV, Hot in Cleveland, The Great Indoors, the 79th, 86th and 87th Academy Awards, 2 Broke Girls and The Ellen DeGeneres Show, for which she won four Emmy awards. She created the NBC sitcom One Big Happy starring Elisha Cuthbert, executive produced by Ellen DeGeneres.

Since 2008, Feldman has been the host of This Just Out, a YouTube talk show that celebrates lesbian culture. The “gay positive” show is filmed at Liz's kitchen table and features LGBTQ and LGBTQ-friendly actors, comedians, writers and musicians. Liz has been an outspoken advocate for LGBTQ rights. In 2008, her joke about same-sex marriage ("It's very dear to me, the issue of gay marriage, or as I like to call it 'marriage,' you know, because I had lunch this afternoon, not gay lunch. I park my car, I didn't gay park it.") went viral, recreated thousands of times across various platforms in the campaign against Prop 8, which sought to outlaw same sex marriage. In 2012, she was named one of The Advocate's "40 Under 40." In 2016, she signed a multi-year overall deal with CBS Studios to develop new projects.

In 2019, Feldman created and produced the Netflix dark comedy series Dead to Me, executive produced by Will Ferrell and Adam McKay. Dead to Me premiered on Netflix on May 3, 2019. The series was renewed for a second season which was released on Netflix on May 8, 2020. In July 2020, Netflix renewed the series for a third and final season. On July 6, 2020, Netflix announced that it had entered into an exclusive multi-year development deal with Feldman, under which all of her future productions will be Netflix Original series.

In 2020, she won the WGA Award for Best Episodic Comedy for the pilot episode of Dead to Me. She was also named to The Hollywood Reporters "50 Most Powerful LGBTQ Players in Hollywood" list.

Personal life
Liz Feldman is married to musician Rachael Cantu. They were married in 2013 and live in Los Angeles, California. They welcomed their first child in October 2022.

Awards and nominations

References

External links
 

1977 births
American Internet celebrities
American television actresses
Television personalities from New York City
American women television personalities
Television producers from New York City
American women television producers
American television writers
Living people
People from Brooklyn
Place of birth missing (living people)
Video bloggers
Women video bloggers
American women comedians
American women television writers
Actresses from New York City
American women bloggers
American bloggers
Jewish American actresses
Jewish American screenwriters
Screenwriters from New York (state)
21st-century American women writers
21st-century American comedians
American lesbian writers
LGBT people from New York (state)
Lesbian Jews
21st-century American screenwriters
21st-century American Jews